Louis-Philippe Fiset (11 January 1854 – 4 September 1934) was a local physician and politician in the Mauricie area.  He served as Member of the Legislative Assembly from 1900 to 1908.

He was born in 1854 in Saint-Cuthbert, Quebec.

Politics
He unsuccessfully ran as a Liberal candidate in the district of Trois-Rivières in 1896, and served as mayor of Saint-Boniface-de-Shawinigan from 1898 to 1900.

In 1900, Fiset became the Liberal Member of the Legislative Assembly for the district of Saint-Maurice.  He was re-elected in 1904, but did not run for re-election 1908.

During his tenure, the city of Shawinigan was incorporated.

After retirement

Fiset died in Montreal in 1934. Rue Fiset (Fiset Street) in Saint-Boniface-de-Shawinigan was named to honour him.

References

1854 births
1934 deaths
Mayors of places in Quebec
Quebec Liberal Party MNAs
People from Mauricie